Circus Ki Sundari is a Bollywood drama film directed by Balwant Bhatt. It was released in 1941 under the banner of Paramount Film Company.

Cast 
 Jal Merchant
 Gulab
 Puri
 Dhuliya
 Agha

References

External links
 

1941 films
1940s Hindi-language films
Indian black-and-white films
Indian drama films
Circus films